Together Against Genocide (TAG, formerly Tamils Against Genocide) is a non-governmental organization formed in 2008, based in Columbia, Maryland, United States, which has actively protested the Sri Lankan Civil War and what it argues is the genocide of Sri Lankan Tamils. Tamils Against Genocide hired US attorney Bruce Fein to file human rights violation charges against two Sri Lankan officials associated with the civil war in Sri Lanka which has reportedly claimed the lives of thousands of civilians.

See also
 2009 Tamil diaspora protests

References

External links
 Tamils Against Genocide

Organizations based in Maryland
Peace organizations based in the United States
War crimes in the Sri Lankan Civil War
Overseas Tamil organizations